The  is a line of Kobe Municipal Subway connecting Tanigami in Kita-ku, Kobe and Shin-Kobe in Chūō-ku, Kobe. The  line has only these two stations.

Formerly operated by the third-sector Hokushin Kyuko Railway (a subsidiary of Hankyu railway), in 2020 the company was absorbed by the Kobe Municipal Transportation Bureau, and the Hokushin Line became part of the subway network.

Operations
All trains of the line operate through to the Seishin-Yamate Line beyond Shin-Kobe Station.

Stations

History
The Hokushin Line opened on 2 April 1988, including the 7,179m Hokushin Tunnel.

It was headquartered in Kita-ku, Kobe. Investors in the company included Hankyu Railway and Kobe Electric Railway, and it was a subsidiary of Hankyu Hanshin Holdings. On 4 March 2020, the Kobe Municipal Transportation Bureau announced that it would acquire Hokushin Kyuko Railway Co., Ltd. due to financial issues that had been incurred by Hokushin Kyuko;
the transaction was completed on 31 May, after which operation of the Hokushin Line was transferred to the transportation bureau.

References

External links

 (Hokushin Kyuko Electric Railway) 

Transport in Kobe
Railway companies of Japan
Companies based in Kobe
Railway companies established in 1979
Railway companies disestablished in 2020
1979 establishments in Japan
2020 disestablishments in Japan
Hankyu Hanshin Holdings